The Macon Knights were a professional arena football team, playing in the af2 league. They were a 2001 expansion member of af2. They played their home games at Macon Coliseum. The Knights were owned and operated by Beverly Olson. The Knights were formerly coached by Derek Stingley, who was a Defensive Specialist with the Albany Firebirds in the original Arena Football League. And he also is the son of former New England Patriots' wide receiver Darryl Stingley.

History
The franchise was created in 2001, the second year of the af2. Olson's first successful move as owner operator was to bring in local football star Kevin Porter to coach the upstart team. Porter, an alumnus of Auburn University, and the Kansas City Chiefs was also an arena football veteran. Under his leadership, the inaugural team made the playoffs and was named "Expansion Franchise of the Year" by the league. He went on to coach the New Orleans VooDoo and Kansas City Brigade of the AFL.

Two seasons later, Porter led the Knights to the ArenaCup, af2's championship game, where the  Knights lost to the Tulsa Talons 58–40. Afterwards, he left for the parent AFL and a number of his players followed.

Porter was replaced by AFL veteran Mike Hold. Despite his success with other franchises, Hold did not have as good a fortune in Macon. In 2005, after a bad start, Hold was replaced by Derek Stingley.

Stingley took a club that had fallen to 2–5 and, by season's end, managed to get them into the playoffs. The Knights however, lost to the Louisville Fire in the opening round.

After the 2006 season, the team announced they would be shutting down operations. However, on October 10, 2008, the Macon Telegraph reported that an investor is "deeply interested" in relaunching the Knights franchise in Macon, as early as 2009, but no later than 2010.

Head coaches
Note: Statistics are correct through the end of the 2006 af2 season.

Statistics and records

Season-by-season results
Note: The Finish, Wins, Losses, and Ties columns list regular season results and exclude any postseason play.

Notes

External links
 Official website
 Macon Knights on ArenaFan.com
 Official Fan Club

 
2001 establishments in Georgia (U.S. state)
2006 disestablishments in Georgia (U.S. state)